ACP may refer to:

Organizations

Medicine
 Albany College of Pharmacy, New York
 American College of Pathology, an association of diagnostic pathologists, physicians, and laboratory professionals, based in Houston, TX
 American College of Physicians, a national organization of internal medicine physicians in the US
 American College of Prosthodontists, dentistry
 American College of Psychiatrists, a US association of psychiatrists based in Chicago, Illinois
 Appalachian College of Pharmacy, Virginia, US
 Association of Cancer Physicians, a specialty association in the UK for medical oncologists
 Australian College of Pharmacy

Politics
 Australian Citizens Party , a political party in Australia previously known as Citizens Electoral Council
 Australian Communist Party (2019), a political party in Australia founded in 2019
 A Coruña (Parliament of Galicia constituency)
 Aberdeen Central (Scottish Parliament constituency)
 Aberdeen Central (UK Parliament constituency)
 Aberdeenshire Central (UK Parliament constituency)
 A Connecticut Party, a political party formed in 1990 in Connecticut, US
 Active Citizen Project, a New York City-based non-profit organization founded in 2003
 African, Caribbean and Pacific Group of States
 Alliance for Climate Protection, a non-profit organization involved in education and advocacy related to climate change
 American College of Pediatricians, a socially conservative advocacy group of pediatricians and other healthcare professionals, Gainesville, FL
 Asociación Cívica de Potosí, a Nicaraguan political organization founded in 1996

Publishing
 Are Media formerly ACP Magazines and Australian Consolidated Press
 Academy Chicago Publishers
 Associated Construction Publications

Other groups
 Aerospace Cadets of the Philippines, a co-educational youth program oriented in aerospace technology
 Associated Collegiate Press, a national organization for college student media in the US
 Association of Chess Professionals, a non-profit organisation to protect the rights of professional chess players and promote chess worldwide
 Association of Chinese Professionals
 Atari Coldfire Project, a volunteer project that has created a modern Atari ST computer clone called the FireBee
 Audax Club Parisien, a cycling club
 American Charities for Palestine, a non-profit organisation supporting the development of Palestinian education

Science
 Acampe, an orchid genus
 Accessory gland protein, a non-sperm component of semen
 Acepromazine, veterinary sedative
 Acetophenone, a chemical compound
 ACP1 (low molecular weight phosphotyrosine protein phosphatase), an enzyme encoded by the human ACP1 gene
 ACP2 (lysosomal acid phosphatase), an enzyme encoded by the human ACP2 gene
 ACP3 (Prostatic acid phosphatase), an enzyme produced by the prostate
 Acyl carrier protein, a component in both fatty acid and polyketide biosynthesis
 Anterior chamber paracentesis, a surgical procedure done to reduce intraocular pressure of the eye
 Asian citrus psyllid, or Diaphorina citri, a citrus pest and vector of citrus-greening disease
 Atmospheric Chemistry and Physics, scientific publication
 Autologous Conditioned Plasma, used for treatment of injuries
 Automatic and controlled processes, the two categories of cognitive processing

Technology
 AC Propulsion, electric vehicle drive systems company
 IBM Airline Control Program, software operating system
 Algebra of Communicating Processes in mathematics
 Aluminium Composite Panel, building material
 Automatic Colt Pistol, designating several cartridges
 Average CPU power in computing

Other uses
 Address confidentiality program, for crime victims
 Advance care planning, for adults establishing their medical care policy in case they become incapacitated 
 Advanced clinical practitioner, a UK term for mid-level practitioner
 Affordable Connectivity Program, for low-income households
 Airport Core Programme, Hong Kong
 Assistant Commissioner of Police, India and Hong Kong
 Attorney–client_privilege, a common-law concept in the United States
 Eastern Acipa language, a Kainji language of Nigeria
 Sahand Airport, Maragheh, Iran (IATA: ACP)

See also
ACP Rail International, a division of ACP Marketing
American Computer and Peripheral, a defunct computer company
ACPS (disambiguation)